Zhou You Rao (born December 23, 1983) is a Chinese Grand Prix motorcycle racer.

Career statistics

By season

Races by year

(key)

External links
http://www.motogp.com/en/riders/You+Rao+Zhou

1983 births
Living people
Chinese motorcycle racers
125cc World Championship riders